John Mahon (born 8 December 1911 – 1993) was a professional footballer who played at outside-right. Born in Gillingham, Kent, he played professionally for Doncaster Rovers, Leeds United, West Bromwich Albion, Huddersfield Town and York City. During World War II he appeared as a guest player for Aldershot, Bradford City, Chelsea, Halifax Town, Leeds United, Millwall, Queens Park Rangers, Reading, Torquay United and West Ham United.

References

External links
 Jack Mahon at Leeds United FC History

1911 births
1993 deaths
English footballers
People from Gillingham, Kent
Association football wingers
English Football League players
Doncaster Rovers F.C. players
Leeds United F.C. players
West Bromwich Albion F.C. players
Huddersfield Town A.F.C. players
York City F.C. players
English football managers
IF Elfsborg managers
English expatriate football managers
Expatriate football managers in Sweden